"Do You Right" is a song by 311, released as a single in April 1993, from their album Music which was released  February 9, 1993.

Track listing
 "Do You Right (Edit)" – 3:46
 "Do You Right (Album)" – 4:16

Charts

References

1993 singles
311 (band) songs
Song recordings produced by Eddy Offord
1993 songs
Songs written by Nick Hexum
Songs written by SA Martinez
Songs written by Chad Sexton
Capricorn Records singles